Pseudoomphalina compressipes is a species of fungus belonging to the family Tricholomataceae.

Synonym:
 Agaricus compressipes Peck, 1883 (= basionym)

References

Tricholomataceae